Nanocetorhinus is an extinct genus of sharks in the subclass Neoselachii. The type and only described species is N. tuberculatus, which existed in what is now Slovakia during the Miocene epoch, and was described by Charlie J. Underwood and Jan Schlogl in 2011. It was described from 28 fossilized teeth.

Taxonomy
Nanocetorhinus was described by Underwood and Schlogl in 2011, from 28 partial and complete fossil teeth (holotype: Z 27485) discovered in the Laksarska Nova Ves Formation at Cerová-Lieskové, Vienna Basin, in Slovakia. It was placed incertae sedis into the chondrichthyan subclass Neoselachii. The authors expressed an uncertainty with regards to the validity of the genus being assigned to this subclass, as the teeth from which it was described bore minimal resemblance to those of previously known neoselachian genera.

Etymology
The generic name combines the Latin term "nano" ("dwarvish") with "Cetorhinus" (the generic name of the basking shark), and references the resemblance the teeth of Nanocetorhinus bear to those of Cetorhinus, but on a smaller scale. The species epithet refers to the tuberculate surface ornament of the teeth.

Description
Underwood and Schlogl theorized that Nanocetorhinus was a planktivorous shark, similarly to its namesake, although there is no consequential evidence that the two genera are closely related. The teeth were little more than 1 mm long at the largest. The authors described the form of the teeth as "simple and rather irregular", and mentioned a lack of wear on the cutting edges, indicating that they were not used to grab and puncture meat, but rather played a minimal role in the process of food consumption. They also noted that the irregular form was more consistent with those of planktivorous sharks.

References

Miocene sharks
Fossil taxa described in 2011
Neogene fish of Europe